Frenzied Bus is a 1990 Soviet crime film. The story is based on real events that occurred on 1 December 1988, when there was a hijacking of a bus with children in Ordzhonikidze.

Plot 
The events occurred in Ordzhonikidze in 1988 and this is when the movie took place. In the film, criminals hijack a passenger bus from the city bus station. The criminals see a group of school children waiting for a bus after a field trip, and they invite them onto the bus and then take the children and their teacher hostage.

Meanwhile, police radio communications report the hijacking of the bus (without knowledge of the hostage-takers). The bus is spotted by local KGB officers, who heard the news on the radio of his official car ATC communications. The bus leaves the square in front of the local executive committee and the criminals open fire from the broken window on the door of the bus. The bus driver is seriously wounded.

Cast
 Ivars Kalniņš as Colonel Valentin Orlov (voiced by Sergei Malishevsky)
 Igor Bochkin as Pavel Melkoyants, terrorist ringleader 
 Anna Samokhina as Tamara Fotaki, Pavel's wife
 Anna Tikhonova as teacher
Amayak Akopyan as Zhila, terrorist
 Igor Kashintsev as  Major General
 Emmanuil Vitorgan as Mr. Anouk, a member of the Israeli Foreign Ministry
 Boris Shcherbakov as Boris Vasilievich, a member of the USSR Foreign Ministry
 Alexander Kuznetsov as flight engineer
 Aristarkh Livanov as Viktor, Soviet Ambassador in  Pakistan
 Pyotr Shcherbakov as pilot

Filming
The first half of the film (including scenes of the taking of child hostages) was shot on location in Vladikavkaz, where the actual events took place, for 26 days. It was planned that the shooting of some scenes would take place in Israel, but instead the director had to use Moscow for Tel Aviv locations. The scenes of the Israeli Foreign Ministry were filmed at the Hotel Russia, whereas Moscow's Sheremetyevo Airport stood in for Tel Aviv's Ben Gurion Airport.

References

External links
 

1990 films
Gorky Film Studio films
1990s crime action films
Action films based on actual events
Films about hijackings
Soviet crime action films
Russian crime action films
Films set in Israel
1990s Russian-language films